Richard Hewet (by 1463 – 1519), of Exeter, Devon, was an English politician.

He was a Member (MP) of the Parliament of England for Exeter in 1512 and 1515. He was mayor of Exeter in 1506–7 and 1513–14.

References

15th-century births
1519 deaths
Mayors of Exeter
Members of the Parliament of England (pre-1707) for Exeter
English MPs 1512–1514
English MPs 1515